Hunewill Peak is a mountain with a summit elevation of  located in the Sierra Nevada mountain range, in Mono County of northern California, United States. The summit is set in Hoover Wilderness on land managed by Humboldt–Toiyabe National Forest. The peak is situated approximately four miles west of Twin Lakes, 1.3 mile southwest of Victoria Peak, and 2.4 miles southwest of line parent Eagle Peak. Precipitation runoff from this mountain drains into tributaries of Robinson and Buckeye Creeks, which are within the Walker River drainage basin.

History

Hunewill Peak is the toponym officially adopted in 1962 by the U.S. Board on Geographic Names to remember Napoleon Bonaparte "N. B." Hunewill (1828–1908), a pioneer who operated the Eagle Creek Lumber Mill in this area in the 1860s and supplied timber to build the mining town of Bodie.

The first ascent of the summit was made in 1946 by Ken Crowley, R. Dickey Jr., Ken Hargreaves, and H. Watty.

Climate
According to the Köppen climate classification system, Hunewill Peak is located in an alpine climate zone. Most weather fronts originate in the Pacific Ocean, and travel east toward the Sierra Nevada mountains. As fronts approach, they are forced upward by the peaks (orographic lift), causing moisture in the form of rain or snowfall to drop onto the range.

See also

 List of mountain peaks of California

Gallery

References

External links
 Weather forecast: Hunewill Peak
 N. B. Hunewill photo
 Hunewill Peak pronunciation

Mountains of Mono County, California
North American 3000 m summits
Mountains of Northern California
Sierra Nevada (United States)
Humboldt–Toiyabe National Forest